The 2016 DFL-Supercup was the seventh edition of the German Super Cup under the name DFL-Supercup, an annual football match contested by the winners of the previous season's Bundesliga and DFB-Pokal competitions. The match was played on 14 August 2016 at the Signal Iduna Park in Dortmund.

It featured Bayern Munich, the winners of the 2015–16 Bundesliga (and the 2015–16 DFB-Pokal), who had lost the three previous super cups and last won in 2012, and 2015–16 Bundesliga runners-up Borussia Dortmund, who last won in 2014. Dortmund qualified as league runners-up by virtue of Bayern winning the league and cup double.

Bayern Munich won the DFL-Supercup 2–0 for their fifth title.

Teams
In the following table, matches until 1996 were in the DFB-Supercup era, since 2010 were in the DFL-Supercup era.

Background
It was Dortmund's eighth DFL-Supercup, with a record of five wins and two losses prior. It was Bayern's fifth consecutive and tenth overall DFL-Supercup, with a record of four wins and five losses prior. This was the fifth DFL-Supercup between Dortmund and Bayern, having previously met in 1989, 2012, 2013, and 2014. Of these, Dortmund have won three (in 1989, 2013, and 2014), while Bayern have won once (2012).

This was the first official match for Carlo Ancelotti as head coach of Bayern.

Match

Summary
Arturo Vidal scored the opening goal for Bayern Munich in the 58th minute with a low right foot finish from six yards out after his initial shot from just outside the penalty box was parried by goalkeeper Roman Bürki back into his path. Thomas Müller got the second in the 79th minute with a close range finish from inside the six yard box after a knock down header from Mats Hummels following a corner.

Details

Statistics

See also
2015–16 Bundesliga
2015–16 DFB-Pokal

References

2016
2016–17 in German football
Borussia Dortmund matches
FC Bayern Munich matches
2016–17 in German football cups
Dfl-Supercup